Whisky jack is a common name for the Canada jay.

Whiskeyjack, whiskyjack or whisky jack  may also refer to:

 Wisakedjak, the trickster god in Anishinaabe mythology
 A bottle jack
 The Thunder Bay Whiskey Jacks, an independent baseball team that became the Schaumburg Flyers
 Whiskey Jack, a Canadian musical group signed with Boot Records
 Whiskeyjack, a member of the Bridgeburners in the fantasy series Malazan Book of the Fallen